Ezhou is a prefecture-level city in eastern Hubei Province, China. As of the 2020 census, the city had a population of 1,079,353, of which 695,697 lived in the core Echeng District. The Ezhou - Huanggang built-up (or metro) area was home to 1,152,559 inhabitants made of the Echeng and Huangzhou, Huanggang Districts.

Geography
Ezhou lies on the southern bank of the Yangtze River east of the southern section of  Wuchang, across the river from the city of Huanggang, to which it is connected by the Ehuang Bridge.

There are many lakes in Ezhou, including the Liangzi Lake in Liangzihu District and Yanglan Lake, along with more than 133 lakes and pools. The city is the origin of Wuchang Bream and as a result is nicknamed "city of one hundred lakes" and "the land of fish and rice".

Climate

History

The name "Ezhou" dates to the Han Dynasty (206BCE220CE) and derives from the nearby ancient Zhou Dynasty (1046256BCE) vassal State of E. Although the administrative seat of the city changed several times, the name remained unchanged until the Three Kingdoms era (220−280) at which time it became the capital of the state of Eastern Wu ruled by Sun Quan and was renamed "Wuchang". This name remained in use as late as 1915, which proved confusing to travelers, as it was also applied to the much larger city of Wuchang, itself shortly to become part of Wuhan.

Throughout China's history Ezhou has remained an important city politically, economically, and militarily with its strategic position along the middle part of the Yangtze River. It is also an important location in the history of the Pure Land Sect of Buddhism.

Administration
Ezhou has three districts:

Economy

Ezhou has six ports on the Yangtze including one than can handle up to  vessels. Many important rail lines and national highways cross the area. This infrastructure make it a major logistics and distribution center. Important industries include metallurgy, construction materials, textiles, chemicals, and machinery.

Transportation
Ezhou is served by the E-Huang Expressway, China National Highways 106 and 316, the Wuhan–Jiujiang Railway, the Wuhan–Huangshi intercity railway of the Wuhan Metropolitan Area Intercity Railway and Ezhou Huahu Airport. Ezhou has two bridges over the Yangtze.

The Ezhou railway station, located southwest of downtown, has an interesting layout, somewhat similar to that of the Secaucus Junction in New Jersey. Until 2014, there was just one rail line there: the north–south Wuhan–Jiujiang Railway, which is served by a large number of trains traveling from Wuhan to Nanchang and points further east and south (Fujian, Zhejiang, etc.). Until 2013, there were no commuter trains in per se in Hubei, but it took only about one hour (usually, with a stop at Huarong) to reach one of Wuhan's train stations (such as Wuchang railway station) train station from Ezhou using any of those trains. In 2014, the Wuhan-Huangshi intercity railway of the Wuhan Metropolitan Area Intercity Railway, the region's new commuter line system, was opened. This line, which runs east–west in the area, has crossed the Wuhan–Jiujiang Railway tracks at the right angle just south of the previously existing Ezhou station. To accommodate the new line, the Ezhou Station was expanded in 2013–2014, with platforms constructed on the new commuter line, providing a possibility for an easy transfer between the two lines. This is said to be the first station in China with this layout.

The trains on the commuter line travel to the Wuhan Railway Station (30–40 min from Ezhou).

The commuter line has one more station in Ezhou, farther to the east. It is Ezhou East,  from Wuhan Railway Station.

Tourism

Ezhou has several tourism sites, including the West Hill (which is in the center of the city), and the nearby Lotus Hill. There are also three lakes, Liangzi Lake, Yanglan Lake and Honglian Lake.

References

External links

Official Website

 
Cities in Hubei
Populated places on the Yangtze River
Prefecture-level divisions of Hubei
Huanggang
Wuhan urban agglomeration
Former prefectures in Hubei
Prefectures of the Sui dynasty
Prefectures of the Tang dynasty
Prefectures of the Song dynasty
Prefectures of the Yuan dynasty
Prefectures of Yang Wu
Prefectures of Southern Tang
Prefectures of Later Zhou